Robert Campbell (1769–1846) was a merchant and politician in Sydney. He was a member of the first New South Wales Legislative Council. Campbell, a suburb of Canberra was named in his honour.

Life and career

Campbell was born in Greenock, Inverclyde, Scotland and at the age of 27 moved to India to join his older brother John. In India, he and his brother were partners in Campbell Clark & Co., merchants of Calcutta, which in July 1799 became Campbell & Co. when the Clarkes gave up their interest in the firm. In 1798, Robert Campbell, with a cargo from Calcutta, visited Sydney to develop a trading connexion there, and he also purchased some land at Dawes Point, near the western entrance of Sydney Cove. In February 1800, he returned to Sydney with another cargo to both settle in Sydney, and to establish a branch of Campbell & Co. In 1801 he married Commissary John Palmer's sister Sophia Palmer (1777–1833). After settling in Sydney he built the private Campbell's wharf and warehouses on his land at Dawes Point, and developed a large business as a general merchant.

In the early years, Campbell & Co.'s business dealings involved importing goods and spirits from Calcutta for sale in Sydney, but not all voyages were successful. For example, in 1802 the Campbell & Co. brig Fly, captained by John Black, and "laden with piece and other valuable goods" was lost at sea on its return voyage from Kolkata to Sydney. Despite losses such as this, Campbell & Co. was heavily involved in the Australian trade, having £50,000 worth of goods in its Sydney warehouses in 1804. As part of its import business, the firm also fulfilled government contracts for supplies from India, mainly livestock for the Sydney and Derwent settlements, which Governor Philip Gidley King calculated had brought Campbell's firm £16,000 from the government alone between 1800 and 1804.

In 1805 and 1806, Campbell and his family travelled to England. During this time his brother-in-law John Palmer acted as his agent.

After the arrival of Governor William Bligh in August 1806, Campbell's high character led to him being appointed treasurer to the public funds, naval officer and collector of taxes. There being no bank at Sydney in 1807, the gaol and orphan funds were deposited with Campbell & Co. on its undertaking to pay interest at five per cent.

Campbell built Australia's first shipbuilding yards in 1807, at the site that is now the Royal Sydney Yacht Squadron, Kirribilli.

In 1809 Campbell chartered a ship the Brothers and sent it on a sealing expedition to New Zealand under Captain Robert Mason. He probably intended it to go to Solander Island in Foveaux Strait but instead, in November, it landed a gang on two islets on what is now the coast of the city of Dunedin on the southeast coast of the South Island. These are the first identifiable Europeans recorded as landing in the area, although others probably preceded them. The gang included the ex-convict William Tucker. When the Brothers returned to relieve its men it found only Tucker and Daniel Wilson at Otago Harbour where it anchored on 3 May 1810. This is the first reference to a European ship entering the harbour although others had probably preceded it. Tucker would later return and become the first European to settle in the area. While it was no part of his intention Campbell was thus instrumental in bringing the territory which is now Dunedin into the European sphere.

Unfortunately, the ship was wrecked on a reef off the coast of New Guinea, but no lives wore lost. In compensation he was granted £3,000,  of land and 710 sheep. In 1825, James Ainslie established a sheep station called Pialligo for Campbell in the area where Canberra is now situated. In 1846, Robert renamed the property Duntroon after his ancestral Duntrune Castle, Argyll and Bute, Scotland. In later years Campbell provided half the cost of the church of St John the Baptist in its original form.

In December 1825 Campbell was appointed a member of the first New South Wales Legislative Council. In January 1830, he was a member of the committee which recommended that King's schools should be founded at Sydney and Parramatta, and as evidence of his continued high standing in the community, when the Savings Bank of New South Wales was founded in 1832, it was found that Campbell had deposited with him £8000 belonging to convicts, and £2000 belonging to free people. He was allowing seven and a half per cent interest on these deposits. Campbell retired from the legislative council and from public life in 1843, and in 1844 his name was included in a list of those considered eligible for a proposed local order of merit.

Campbell had seven children, John, Robert, Sophia, Charles, Sarah, George and Frederick. John, Robert and Charles became politicians like their father, all being on the Legislative Council, and John and Robert also being on the Legislative Assembly.

In 1910, with the creation of the Australian Capital Territory, the government acquired Duntroon for the creation of the Royal Military College. The original Duntroon homestead (though later extended) is now the officers mess in the Royal Military College.

References

1769 births
1846 deaths
Scottish emigrants to colonial Australia
19th-century Australian businesspeople
History of the Australian Capital Territory
People from Greenock
Australian landowners
Australian people in whaling
British people in whaling
Australian ship owners
Sealers
Members of the New South Wales Legislative Council
19th-century landowners